A continuous flow intersection (CFI), also called a crossover displaced left-turn (XDL or DLT), is an alternative design for an at-grade road junction. Vehicles attempting to turn across the opposing direction of traffic (left in right-hand drive jurisdictions; right in left-hand drive jurisdictions) cross before they enter the intersection. No left turn signal in the intersection is then necessary. Instead, vehicles traveling in both directions can proceed, including through vehicles and those turning right or left, when a generic traffic signal/stop sign permits.

Its design also is promoted as part of the Federal Highway Administration's Every Day Counts initiative which started in 2011.

History 
A fly-over designed CFI interchange (separated grade) was invented by Francisco Mier. An intersection (at-grade) variant followed. Over 40 have been implemented since 2000. Mier patented his design and required a fee to obtain a license to the design. The patent expired in the United States on 15 October 2003.

This general configuration has appeared in different versions in various places, with the implementation of channelization in the United States since the 1950s, such as the Telegraph Road section of U.S. Route 24 in Michigan at Plymouth Road in Redford Charter Township, Michigan.

Usage

Australia 
 Salerno Street, Bundall Road and Ashmore Road intersection, in Gold Coast, Queensland, has Australia's first continuous-flow intersection. The intersection was upgraded as Continuous-flow in December 2017.
 Hoddle Street, a major north/south arterial road near Melbourne’s Central Business District (known as the “Hoddle Grid”) has suffered major congestion for several years. The state of Victoria announced in their budget for 2016/7 that several intersections will be converted to continuous flow intersections. Various right turns along Hoddle Street have now been replaced with U-turns, which then require turning left at the desired street.
Intersection of Anzac Parade, Alison Road and Dacey Avenue in Moore Park, New South Wales was proposed in 2017 to be converted to a continuous-flow intersection.

Canada 
 Intersection of the Charlottetown Perimeter Highway with St. Peters Road in Charlottetown, Prince Edward Island opened on November 29, 2020.

China 
 Intersection of Caitian Road and Fuhua Road in Futian, Shenzhen. In operation since 7 October 2017.

Germany 
 Single-leg CFI at Eppendorfer Park in Hamburg between Breitenfelder Straße (Bundesstraße 5) and Tarpenbekstraße (Bundesstraße 433),

Mexico 
 Between Chapultepec, Puesta del Sol and Av Eloy Cavazos, Guadalupe, Nuevo León, 
 Manuel Gómez Morin Bermúdez aund De La Industria, Bermúdez, Juárez Municipality, Chihuahua, 
 Paseo de la Reforma / Periférico und Luis Echeverría, Saltillo, Coahuila,

United Kingdom 
 On A4311 road, Cricklade Road and Thamesdown Drive in Swindon, opened in 2003,

United States 

Listed in chronological order:

 Haddon Township, Audubon and Audubon Park, New Jersey, New Jersey Route 168 at Nicholson Road, is a hybrid one-leg continuous flow intersection that also employs a jughandle. 
 Shirley, New York, opened in 1996, at the entrance to Dowling College. 
 Accokeek, Maryland, opened in 2000, at the intersection of Routes 210 and 228. This is an example of a CFI-T, which is a T intersection containing one CFI leg. This junction also has characteristics of a continuous green T (or seagull) intersection. While neither of the routes is grade-separated, southbound through traffic on Route 210 is free-flowing. 
 Baton Rouge, Louisiana, opened in March 2006, at the intersection of Airline Highway and Siegen Lane. 
 Along Utah State Route 154 (Bangerter Highway) at
 5400 South (SR-173) in Taylorsville, 
 4700 South in Taylorsville and West Valley City, 
 4100 South in West Valley City, 
 3500 South (SR-171) in West Valley City, opened in September 2007, 
 3100 South in West Valley City, 
 Fenton, Missouri, opened October 2007, at the intersection of Highway 30 and Summit Drive/Gravois Bluffs Boulevard. 
 Miami Township, Montgomery County, Ohio, a two-leg CFI constructed in the spring of 2009, at the intersection of SR 741 and Miamisburg-Springboro Road/Austin Boulevard. 
 Salt Lake County, Utah, in October 2009, the Utah Department of Transportation announced plans for five more continuous flow intersections along Bangerter Highway and Redwood Road (SR-68). As of March 11, 2011, four of them were in use.
 13400 South and Bangerter Highway in Riverton, 
 7000 South and Bangerter Highway in West Jordan, 
 6200 South (Bennion Boulevard) and Bangerter Highway in Taylorsville, 
 W 5400 S (SR-173) and Redwood Road in Taylorsville, 
 6200 South (Bennion Boulevard) and Redwood Road in Taylorsville, 
 Natchez, Mississippi, opened January 2010 at the intersection of US 61 and Junkin Drive, designed by ABMB Engineers and constructed by MDOT. 
 Lafayette, Louisiana, ground broke January 2010 at the intersection of US 167 (Johnston St.) and Camellia Boulevard. Estimated cost of $3.5 million. 
 Loveland, Colorado, ground broke June 2010 at the intersection of US 34 (Eisenhower Boulevard) and Madison Avenue. Estimated cost of $4 million. 
 Orem, Utah, opened May 22, 2012 at the intersection of University Parkway and Sandhill Road, as part of the Interstate 15 CORE project. 
  Durango, Colorado, at the intersection of US 160 and US 550. Estimated cost of $6.1 million. 
 Laurel, Maryland, at the intersection of MD 200 and US 1; opened November 7, 2014. This is a CFI-T, with a similar configuration as that for Accokeek, Maryland, listed above. Northbound through traffic on US 1 is free-flowing. 
  Oxford, Mississippi, at the intersection of Mississippi Highway 6 and West Jackson Avenue; opened April 29, 2015.
  Cedar Park, Texas, opened on August 2, 2016 at the intersection of RM 1431 and Ronald Reagan Boulevard/Parmer Lane. The project, which included widening nearby roads from four to six lanes, cost $18.2 million. 
  San Marcos, Texas, two CFIs were constructed. One is a single-leg CFI at the intersection of Loop 82 (Aquarena Springs Drive), Interstate 35's southbound frontage road and I-35's southbound-to-northbound Texas U-turn. The other, a two-leg CFI, is at the intersection of State Highway 80 (Hopkins Street), I-35's frontage roads and I-35's Texas U-turns. In both intersections, the displaced left turn lanes merge with the Texas U-turn lanes. The estimated cost for both CFIs is $4.7 million.
  Dawsonville, Georgia, opened May 15, 2017 at the intersection of SR 400 and SR 53. This is a two-leg CFI, estimated by the Georgia Department of Transportation in 2010 to cost about $14 million. 
 Anderson Township, Hamilton County, Ohio, two-leg CFI opened May 19, 2017, at the intersection of Beechmont Avenue (State Route 125) and Five Mile Road. 
  Colorado Springs, Colorado, two-leg CFI opened in December 2017 at the intersection of Woodmen Road and Union Boulevard. 
 Norfolk, Virginia, two-leg CFI, left turns from Military Highway onto Northampton Boulevard and Princess Anne Road opened July 28, 2018. 
 San Antonio, Texas, two-leg CFI, left turns from Bandera Road to Loop 1604 opened on April 28, 2019. Like the ones in San Marcos, the displaced left turn lanes merge with the Texas U-turn lanes. 
 Fort Myers, Florida, two-leg CFI, left turns from State Road 82 to Daniels Parkway (west) and Gunnery Road (east).  First CFI in Florida.  Opened July 9, 2019. 
 Charlotte, North Carolina, two-leg CFI, left turns from NC 16 to Mount Holly-Huntersville Road.  First CFI in North Carolina.  Opened October 18, 2019.
 Olathe, Kansas, two-leg CFI, left turns from Old 56 Highway to Lone Elm Road. First CFI in Kansas. Opened June, 2021.

Operational details 
Part of the delay at a typical high-volume right-hand traffic intersection is to accommodate left-turns; through-traffic must wait for the traffic turning left because it crosses the path of the through traffic. The continuous flow intersection moves the left-turn conflict out of the intersection and synchronizes it with the signal cycle of the intersecting road.

In the adjacent diagram, while the left/right traffic flows through the main intersection, the  left-turn traffic crosses to the opposite side of the oncoming traffic a few hundred feet away. Doing this removes the crossing conflict. When the north/south through traffic is allowed through the main intersection, the north/south left-turn lanes are also allowed through the intersections as their paths are no longer crossing.  All traffic flow is controlled by traffic signals as at a regular intersection.

The Louisiana DOTD article on the Baton Rouge CFI includes a particularly informative diagram of that intersection.

To reduce confusion regarding the left-turn lane, the left-turn lane and the straight-through lanes are usually separated by a concrete barrier or traffic island.  This diagram shows the straight-through lanes offset by one lane through the intersection and are guided by lines painted through the intersection.  But this is just a sample configuration; the lanes may be offset by more lanes or none at all.

Nonetheless, due to the provision of traffic between two directions of opposing traffic, some motorists tend to maintain an ongoing criticism of the intersection.  Additionally, as in the case of the half-CFI in Accokeek, the offset left-turn traffic reenters the main traffic stream via a half-signal, requiring motorists to merge from a stop condition onto the higher-speed mainline.  Motorists sometimes cite discomfort due to the speed differential, a known cause of accidents, though conflicts could be reduced through the provision of an adequate acceleration lane and merge area.  The Accokeek, MD CFI also has notable inequalities in traffic flow depending upon the direction of travel.

This type of intersection can require a significant amount of right-of-way to implement (dependent upon the configuration), which is why the technique is not frequently used in urban areas. However, the amount of right-of-way necessary for construction and final operation is still typically less than that of an interchange. Additionally, as there is no grade separation involved, costs are considerably less than that of an interchange alternative.

Case studies 
The redesign of the Redwood Road/6200 South intersection in Taylorsville, Utah cut emissions of carbon dioxide by 19 tons (17 tonnes) per year.

Parallel-flow intersection 
A parallel-flow intersection (PFI) is a variant similar to the CFI, patented in 2006. It arranges the left-turning traffic in a different manner; it is not displaced, instead turning left closer to the intersection onto a parallel roadway, to the left of oncoming traffic. This was first used in New Jersey at the junction of New Jersey Route 168 and US Highway 130, between Haddon Township and Camden.

See also

References

External links 
 Federal Highway Administration, Alternative Intersection Treatments - CFI
 University of Maryland, ATTAP - Animation of a CFI (QuickTime required). Additional information may be accessed via the links on the left side.
 Note that due to the relatively recent installation of the CFI in Baton Rouge, West Valley, UT, and Fenton, MO, some images may not show the existing conditions.
 Deseret News story about CFI
 KSL News story about CFI
 U.S. Department of Transportation
 CFI open in Natchez, MS
 Seonyeong Cheong, Saed Rahwanji and Gang-Len Chang: Comparison of Three Unconventional Arterial Intersection Designs: CFI, PFI and Upstream Signalized Crossover, ATTAP, University of Maryland, 3 June 2008
 DISPLACED LEFT TURN INTERSECTION Informational Guide, Federal Highway Administration, Publication No. FHWA-SA-14-068, August 2014

Road junction types
Articles containing video clips